Madhuriputra was an Ahir king who ruled over  the Nashik in the 3rd century AD . The Nashik inscription speaks of a king Madhuriputra Ishwarsena / Mathariputra Ishvarsena, who was an Ahir and a son of Shivadatta who was said to be the founder of this dynasty. This dynasty originated around 249-250BCE, an era that would be known as Kalachuri-Chedi era in later times. They would rule the region around Nashik. Some historians consider them to be a branch of the Satavahanas. After the fall of Satavahana Dynasty in 199A.D , Abir Dynasty is said to rule over Nashik and the northeast. Madhuriputra was one of the ten kings of this dynasty who ruled Nashik for 67 Years. 
 
Historically, Ahirs founded Ahir Batak town (Ahrora) in Central Provinces and Ahirwada in Jhansi. Rudramurti Ahir, an Army General, who later became a king, Madhuriputr, Ishwarsena and Shivdatta like well known kings of Ahir lineage mingled with  Rajputs. 
Historically, Ahirs founded Ahir Batak town (Ahrora) in Central Provinces and Ahirwada in Jhansi. Rudramurti Ahir, an Army General, who later became a king, Madhuriputr, Ishwarsena and Shivdatta like well known kings of Ahir lineage mingled with  Rajputs.

References

Indian monarchs